Glyn Hopkins (born 1 October 1928) was a British gymnast. He competed in eight events at the 1948 Summer Olympics.

References

1928 births
Living people
British male artistic gymnasts
Olympic gymnasts of Great Britain
Gymnasts at the 1948 Summer Olympics
Sportspeople from Pontypridd
20th-century British people